Signal Entertainment Group Corp., founded in 1991, is a South Korean company specializing in the following businesses: show business, media and entertainment content, cosmetics and information technology.

History 

Founded in 1991 as Signal Information & Communication Corp. (Signal I&C), the company was the national licensee of the now-defunct American company Motorola. In 1997, it partnered with the now-defunct Korea Telecom Freetel (a Korea Telecom (KT) company) for PCS service.

1999 was the year when Signal I&C became the official distributor of Motorola Multimedia Group Cable Services. It also partnered with KT for PCS service.  Signal I&C got the ISO 9001 certification in this same year.

In 2001, Signal I&C signed a business partnership with Lucent (presently Alcatel-Lucent), then partnered with SK Telecom for IMT Advanced service.

Then in 2003, the company signed another  business partnership, this time  with CommWorks Corporation (then a subsidiary of now-defunct 3Com, presently a subsidiary of UTStarcom). Later on, it partnered again with KT for ATM service.

Signal I&C joined the Korea Exchange (KRX)'s KOSDAQ index in 2011.

2015 became the start of a new era for the company as it launched its present corporate name - then started to diversify into the show business, media and cosmetics industries.

Mergers and acquisitions

2014
 Unione I&M was a television production company, founded in 2005. As of today, it is now a division by name of Signal.

2015
 Better ENT, formerly Storm S Company, is a talent agency founded by actor Song Seung-heon in 2009. 
 Big Hit Entertainment is a recording label founded by Bang Si-hyuk in 2005. In early 2016, BigHit ended their stake relationship with Signal Entertainment Group. BigHit issued a 6 billion won convertible bond Signal Entertainment Group in 2015. After a year, Signal Entertainment Group made a full settlement of the bonds.
 Jungle Entertainment is a recording label founded by Tiger JK in 2006.
 Skinanniversary Co. Ltd. is a skin care company and the operator of the Skinanniversary Beauty Town in Paju, Gyeonggi Province. It was founded in 2007. 
 S Box Media Company is a television production company and talent agency, founded in 2012.

2016
 L&Holdings is a holding company of four talent agencies: Great Company, L&Company, Star Camp 202 and JR ENT.
 NH Media is a recording label founded by Kim Nam-hee in 1998.

Productions

Television

Variety, reality and talk
 The Body Show (OnStyle, 2015–present)
 I Can See Your Voice (Mnet, 2015–present)
 Please Take Care of My Refrigerator (JTBC, 2014–present)
 Produce 101 (Mnet, 2016)
 The Secret Readers Club (O tvN/tvN, 2015–present)
 Superstar K (Mnet, 2016–present)
 Superstar K 2016

Drama

* produced under subsidiary Signal Pictures
+ produced under subsidiary L&Holdings

Artists
 Choi Song-hyun
 Gong Hyung-jin
 Jin Tae-hyun
 Lee Mi-yeon

Jungle Entertainment

L&Holdings
Great Company
 Kang Sung-yeon
 Jung Seong-woo
 Song Ok-sook
 Shim Yi-young
 Yang Jung-a

L&Company
 Yoo Gun

Star Camp 202
 Shin Da-eun 

JR ENT
 Nam Sang-mi
 Song Seon-mi

NH Media

S Box Media Company
 Lee Sang-hoon

References

External links
 Official websites:
  
  

 
Companies listed on KOSDAQ
Companies based in Seoul
Entertainment companies established in 1991
Mass media companies established in 1991
Holding companies established in 1991
South Korean companies established in 1991
2011 initial public offerings